The 1973  President's Cup Football Tournament was the third competition of Korea Cup. The competition was held from 22 to 30 September 1973. Burma and the Khmer Republic played out a 0–0 draw and shared the trophy.

Group stage

Group A

Group B

Knockout stage

Bracket

Semi-finals

Third place play-off

Final

See also
Korea Cup
South Korea national football team results

External links
President Park's Cup 1973 (South Korea) at RSSSF

1973